Asociación Mutual Israelita Argentina (AMIA) is a Jewish Community Centre located in Buenos Aires, Argentina.

Established as Jevrá Kedushá in 1894, its mission was conceived to promote the well-being and development of Jewish life in Argentina and to secure the continuity and values of the Jewish community. The association established one of Buenos Aires' first Jewish cemeteries, and later founded the Tsedaká Foundation for charity. Serving the largest Jewish community in Latin America by the 1920s, AMIA inaugurated a new headquarters in Balvanera, a neighbourhood of Buenos Aires, in 1945; AMIA also became the headquarters of the Federation of Jewish Argentine Communities. It grew to provide and sponsor a variety of formal and informal educational, recreational, and cultural activities, as well as a healthcare cooperative. It became a centre for participation and involvement for people of all ages in Jewish life, and in the community at large.

It has an employment agency service that provides connections between employers with potential employees as well as providing training and resources directed to both Jewish and non-Jewish people, with more than 500,000 applicants in its database.

The AMIA also maintains the largest Jewish cemetery in Latin America, La Tablada Israelite Cemetery, established in 1936.

1994 AMIA bombing 

Following the attack, a series of federal and international investigations were launched; though the case remains unresolved, high-ranking members of the government of Iran were indicted, and in 2007, the general assembly of Interpol issued red notices for five Iranian officials. An  centre was later commissioned to replace the destroyed AMIA structure, and in May 1999, the new building, a modernist 8-story structure separated from the street by a protective wall, was inaugurated.

Alternative names
Other English-language names for the organization are: Argentine Jewish Mutual Aid Society,
Argentine Israelite Mutual Aid Association (or Argentine Israelite Mutual Association),
Argentine Jewish Mutual Aid Association,
and
Jewish Mutual Association of Argentina.

References

External links 
  
 AMIA Jewish Community in Argentina at Google Cultural Institute

Balvanera
Buildings and structures in Buenos Aires
Jewish Argentine history
Jewish organisations based in Argentina
Jews and Judaism in Buenos Aires
Organizations established in 1894
1894 establishments in Argentina